Diocese of Turku may refer to the following ecclesiastical jurisdictions with episcopal see in Turku (Åbo), in Finland :

 the former Roman Catholic Diocese of Turku (Åbo)
 Bishopric of Turku, originally Roman Catholic, later Lutheran
 the present Lutheran Archdiocese of Turku